California's 29th congressional district is a congressional district in the U.S. state of California based in the north central San Fernando Valley.

It includes the city of San Fernando, as well as the Los Angeles communities of Van Nuys, Pacoima, Arleta, Panorama City, Sylmar, and parts of Sun Valley and North Hollywood.

Competitiveness

In statewide races

Composition

As of the 2020 redistricting, half of California's 29th congressional district is within Los Angeles County, and half is in northern Los Angeles.

Los Angeles County is split between this district, the 27th district, the 30th district, and the 32nd district. The 29th and 27th are partitioned by Angeles National Forest, Soledad Canyon Road, Southern Pacific Railroad, Sand Canyon Road, Little Tujunga Canyon Road, Santa Clara Truck Trail, Veterans Memorial Park, Golden State Freeway, Devonshire Street, Blue Creek, Chatsworth Street, Balboa Boulevard, Kingsbury Street, Genesta Avenue, Aliso Canyon Wash, and Ronald Reagan Freeway. The 29th and 30th are partitioned by Angeles National Forest, NF-4N35, Gold Creek Road, Big Tujunga Canyon Road, Little Tujunga Road, Longford Street, Clybourne Avenue, Foothill Freeway, Kagel Canyon Street, Osborne Street, Terra Bella Street, Glenoaks Boulevard, Montague Street, San Fernando Road, Branford Street, Tujunga Wash, Wentworth Street, Sheldon Street, Tuxford Street, Sunland Boulevard, Golden State Freeway, Cohasset Street, Sherman Way, Vineland Avenue, Southern Pacific Railroad, Ledge Avenue, West Clark Avenue, North Clybourn Avenue, and the Los Angeles River. The 27th and 32nd are partitioned by San Diego Freeway, Roscoe Boulevard, Reseda Boulevard, Saticoy Street, Lull Street, Garden Grove Avenue, Valerio Street, Etiwanda Avenue, Gault Street, Victory Boulevard, Oxnard Street, Hazeltine Avenue, Burbank Boulevard, Tujunga Wash, Ventura Freeway, Hollywood Freeway, Whipple Street, and Lankershim Boulevard. The 27th district takes in the city of San Fernando and the Los Angeles neighborhoods of Van Nuys, Panorama City, Sylmar, Valley Village, Sun Valley, westside North Hollywood, and central Lake Balboa.

Cities & CDP with 10,000 or more people
 Los Angeles - 3,898,747
 San Fernando - 24,322

List of members representing the district

Election results

1952

1954

1956

1958

1960

1962

1964

1966

1968

1970

1972

1974

1976

1978

1980

1982

1984

1986

1988

1990

1992

1994

1996

1998

2000

2002

2004

2006

2008

2010

2012

2014

2016

2018

2020

Historical district boundaries

From 2003 to 2013, the district consisted of parts of northern Los Angeles, including Burbank, Glendale and Pasadena. Due to redistricting after the 2010 United States Census, the district shifted northwest within Los Angeles County and  includes the northern San Fernando Valley.

See also
List of United States congressional districts

References

External links
GovTrack.us: California's 29th congressional district
RAND California Election Returns: District Definitions
California Voter Foundation map - CD29

29
Government of Los Angeles
Government of Los Angeles County, California
San Fernando Valley
Arleta, Los Angeles
Lake Balboa, Los Angeles
Lake View Terrace, Los Angeles
North Hollywood, Los Angeles
Pacoima, Los Angeles
Panorama City, Los Angeles
San Fernando, California
Sylmar, Los Angeles
Van Nuys, Los Angeles
Constituencies established in 1953
1953 establishments in California